Michael De Medeiros is an American author and editor. He has written or co-written over a dozen books.

De Medeiros has been editor-in-chief of Maximum Fitness magazine and Men's Fitness magazine. He is the President and Chief Content Officer of ContentCavalry.com, a custom content company.

Published works (partial)
Healthy Diet Guide: Eating Clean Super Foods A to Z (with Caitlin Cassidy) - 2015
Green Foods for Men: Powerful Foods for a Clean, Healthy Diet - Fair Winds Press, Beverly MA. , 2015 (with Jenny Westercamp)
Core Fitness Solution: More than 5,000 Customized Workouts You Can Do Anywhere - Fair Winds Press, Beverly MA. , 2014 (with Kendall Wood)
Screws (Simple Machines) - 2013
The NBA (Pro Sports Championships) - AV2 by Weigl, 2012
Chaparrals (Ecosystems) - AV2 by Weigl, 2012
Screws (Science Matters) - AV2 by Weigl, 2009, 24 pages. 
Common Sense (World of Wonder) - Weigl Publishers, 2009, 24 pages. 
Barack Obama (Remarkable People) - AV2 by Weigl, 2008, 24 pages. 
Orangutans (Amazing Animals) - Weigl Publishers, 2008, 24 pages. 
Steve Nash (Remarkable People) - Weigl Educational Publishers Limited, 2008, 24 pages. 
Polar Bears (Amazing Animals) - Weigl Publishers, 2008, 24 pages. 
Mountain Biking (Outdoor Adventures) - AV2 by Weigl, 2007, 24 pages. 
Chaparrals (Biomes) – 2006
Gorillas (Amazing Animals) - Weigl Publishers, 2006, 24 pages. 
ELVIS: The Complete Music Catalog - Johnson Gorman Publishing, 2005, 416 pages.  (with Tom De Medeiros and James De medeiros)

References

Living people
American magazine editors
American fiction writers
American exercise and fitness writers
Year of birth missing (living people)